In politics, the term base refers to a group of voters who always support a single political party's candidates for elected office. Base voters are very unlikely to vote for the candidate of an opposing party, regardless of the specific views each candidate holds. In the United States, this is typically because high-level candidates must hold the same stances on key issues as a party's base in order to gain the party's nomination and thus be guaranteed ballot access. In the case of legislative elections, base voters often prefer to support their party's candidate against an otherwise appealing opponent in order to strengthen their party's chances of gaining a simple majority, which is typically the gateway to overarching power in a legislature.

See also 
 Split-ticket voting
 Straight-ticket voting
 Voting bloc

Base